Gimnazijec is a novel by Slovenian author Igor Karlovšek. It was first published in 2004.

See also
List of Slovenian novels

Slovenian novels
2004 novels